Pacific Sogo is a department store chain, headquartered in Taipei, Taiwan. It owns seven stores in Taiwan and five stores in China.

Pacific Sogo started its business in 1986 as a joint venture between Taiwan's Pacific Construction and Japan's Sogo, and in 1987 opened its first department store in Taipei.  Later, as Pacific Construction went through economic difficulties, its shares were obtained by Far Eastern Group, which also owns the Far Eastern department store chain.

See also
 Sogo
 List of shopping malls in Taipei
 List of department stores in Asia

External links

 Pacific Sogo (in Chinese)

Companies based in Taipei
Department stores of Taiwan